Harold Keith Milte (28 May 1917 – 21 August 2003) was an Australian rules footballer who played with Geelong and Collingwood in the Victorian Football League (VFL).

Milte served in the Australian Army during World War II, enlisting in Geelong in 1940.

Notes

External links 

Profile on Collingwood Forever

Keith Milte's playing statistics from The VFA Project

1917 births
2003 deaths
Australian rules footballers from Victoria (Australia)
Australian Rules footballers: place kick exponents
Geelong Football Club players
Collingwood Football Club players
Coburg Football Club players